Jim Morris (August 31, 1935 – January 28, 2016) was an American bodybuilder known for winning competitions over a thirty-year career. Among the titles Morris won are: Mr. USA (1972), AAU Mr. America (1973), Mr. International (1974), and Mr. Olympia Masters Over 60 (1996). At age 50, he became a vegetarian and over 15 years transitioned to vegan, a diet to which he credited much of his excellent health. He posed nude for a PETA ad in support of the vegan lifestyle.

Morris, who still trained regularly as of 2011, had been bodybuilding since September 1954. From 1974 to 1988 he was Elton John's personal bodyguard. He was openly gay. In 1971 he became the first openly gay IFBB professional bodybuilder. In 1973 he became the first openly gay bodybuilder to win AAU Mr. America overall, most muscular, best arms, and best chest titles.

In March 2014 a short documentary-film starring Jim Morris titled Jim Morris: Lifelong Fitness was released on YouTube. The film focuses on his lifelong body building career, vegan lifestyle and Morris' yearning to break stereotypes attached to the elderly.

Morris died on January 28, 2016, at the age of 80.

Competition history

 1959 AAU Mr. New York Metropolitan – 3rd
 1967 AAU Junior Mr. America – 8th
 1967 AAU Junior Mr. USA – 1st
 1967 AAU Mr. New York Metropolitan – 1st
 1967 AAU Mr. New York State – 1st
 1967 AAU Mr. USA – AAU – 9th
 1968 AAU Mr. America – 10th
 1969 AAU Junior Mr. America – 5th
 1970 AAU Mr. America – 8th (most muscular)
 1970 AAU Mr. America – 7th
 1970 AAU Mr. California – 1st (overall and most muscular)
 1970 AAU Mr. Los Angeles – 1st
 1971 IFBB Mr. International – 2nd (tall)
 1972 AAU Mr. America –  3rd (most muscular)
 1972 AAU Mr. USA – 1st (most muscular)
 1973 AAU Mr. America – 1st (most muscular)
 1974 WBBG Mr. International – 1st (tall)
 1977 NABBA Mr. Universe – 1st (tall)
 1996 IFBB Masters Olympia – 1st (masters 60+)
 1996 IFBB Masters Olympia – 10th

References

External links

 10 Keys to a World-Record Bench Press
 Mr. America has bulk – three decades after winning the title
 Vegan Bodybuilding

1935 births
2016 deaths
American bodybuilders
African-American bodybuilders
LGBT African Americans
Gay sportsmen
American LGBT sportspeople
American sportsmen
American veganism activists
LGBT bodybuilders
People associated with physical culture
20th-century African-American sportspeople
21st-century African-American people